Sikeston School District is centered in Sikeston, Missouri.  The district includes several elementary and intermediate grade schools and Sikeston High School.  During the 2008–2009 school year, there was a total of 3,759 students and 346 certified staff members enrolled in the Sikeston R-6 School District. The school colors are red and black and its mascot is the BULLDOG.

Schools

Elementary
Sikeston Kindergarten Center
Lee Hunter Elementary School
Matthews Elementary School
Southeast Elementary School

Middle schools
Sikeston 5th & 6th Grade Center

Junior high schools 
Sikeston 7th & 8th Grade Center

High schools 
Sikeston High School

External links
The Sikeston R-6 School District

School districts in Missouri
Education in New Madrid County, Missouri
Education in Scott County, Missouri